The 2017 ICC Awards were the fourteenth edition of ICC Awards. The voting panel took into account players' performance between 21 September 2016 and 31 December 2017. The announcement of the ICC World XI Teams, along with the winners of the men's individual ICC awards, was made on 18 January 2018. The women's awards were announced on 21 December 2017, with Ellyse Perry winning the inaugural Rachael Heyhoe Flint Award as the Women's Cricketer of the Year.

Award categories and winners

Individual awards

Men's awards

Women's awards

Other awards

ICC Teams of the Year

Men's teams

ICC Men's Test Team of the Year

ICC Men's ODI Team of the Year

Women's teams

ICC Women’s ODI Team of the Year

ICC Women’s T20I Team of the Year

See also

 International Cricket Council
 ICC Awards
 Sir Garfield Sobers Trophy (Cricketer of the Year)
 ICC Test Player of the Year
 ICC ODI Player of the Year
 David Shepherd Trophy (Umpire of the Year)
 ICC Women's Cricketer of the Year
 ICC Test Team of the Year
 ICC ODI Team of the Year

References

International Cricket Council awards and rankings
Crick
ICC Awards